The Tehachapi slender salamander (Batrachoseps stebbinsi) is a species of plethodontid salamander, and one of the larger members of genus Batrachoseps. It is endemic to California, in Kern County in the western United States.

Distribution
The Tehachapi slender salamander is closely related to the Kern Canyon slender salamander. It is considered a threatened species in California, and is found only in isolated areas of the Piute and Tehachapi Mountains of the Transverse Ranges in Southern California. Much of the salamander's habitat is currently located on land owned by Tejon Ranch.

Description
This salamander is dark brown in color with light, glittery-looking speckles of coppery red and silver covering its 3-inch length. Like other plethodontids it lacks lungs and breathes through its skin, which it must keep moist. It lives in damp leaf litter and emerges during high humidity or rain.

Conservation
The Tehachapi slender salamander is an IUCN Red List Vulnerable species.

References

  - Database entry includes a range map, a brief justification of why this species is vulnerable, and the criteria used.

Batrachoseps
Salamander
Salamander
Fauna of the California chaparral and woodlands
Natural history of Kern County, California
Tehachapi Mountains
Amphibians described in 1968